Everything Is Good Here/Please Come Home is the third studio album by Angels of Light. It was released on March 4, 2003, via band leader Michael Gira's own record label, Young God Records.

Produced by Gira himself and engineered by Martin Bisi, the album features extensive contributions from various musicians, including freak folk musician Devendra Banhart, Hungarian violinist Eszter Balint, drummer Thor Harris and composer Joe McGinty. Proceeds from the band's 2002 live album, We Were Alive!, were used to fund the production and recording of the album.

Critical reception
Upon its release, Everything Is Good Here/Please Come Home generally received positive reviews from the music critics. Ned Raggett of Allmusic wrote: Michael Gira maintains the winning streak but explores a newer, more controlled delicacy on Everything is Good Here. He also further added that the album "finds his extremes of harrowing, wrenching music and performance, and a calmer, almost mystical approach, more integrated than ever before." Dominique Leone of Pitchfork praised the album, awarding it as "best new music." He stated: "The music that resonates with as much emotional weight and vital abandon is rare, and though I'm less inclined to look for answers in the mix than revel in its chaos, Everything Is Good Here/Please Come Home is a commendable, heady experience." Andrew Unterberger of Stylus Magazine also commented: "One of the greatest strengths of Everything is Good Here/Please Come Home is its ability to sound majestic without sounding epic – without all the cheesiness and pomposity that epic implies."

Track listing

Personnel
Angels of Light
Michael Gira – vocals, composition, design, acoustic guitar, electric guitar, harmonica, piano, production

Additional musicians
Eszter Balint – violin
Devendra Banhart – vocals
David Coulter – violin, banjo, children's choir arrangement
Siobhan Duffy – vocals
David Garland – accordion, flute
Christopher Hahn – lap steel guitar, electric guitar
Thor Harris – percussion, vibraphone, piano
Joe McGinty –  Fender Rhodes, piano, harmonium
Larry Moses – trumpet
Steve Moses – trombone
Larry Mullins – drums, percussion, vibraphone, Farfisa organ, synthesizer, vocals
Kevin O'Connor – banjo

Other personnel
Martin Bisi – engineering
Doug Henderson – mastering
Ben Kirkendoll – layout design
Jason LaFarge – engineering, recording

References

External links
 Everything Is Good Here/Please Come Home on Young God Records

2003 albums
Angels of Light albums
Young God Records albums
Albums produced by Michael Gira